Hell Canyon Outlaws is a 1957 American Western film directed by Paul Landres and written by Allan Kaufman and Max Glandbard. The film stars Dale Robertson, Brian Keith, Rossana Rory, Dick Kallman, Don Megowan and Mike Lane. The film was released on October 6, 1957, by Republic Pictures.

Plot

Cast
Dale Robertson as Sheriff Caleb Wells
Brian Keith as Happy Waters
Rossana Rory as Maria
Dick Kallman as Smiley Andrews
Don Megowan as Henchman Walt
Mike Lane as Henchman Nels
Buddy Baer as Henchman Stan
Charles Fredericks as Deputy Bear
Alexander Lockwood as Bert 
James Nusser as Oscar Schultz
James Maloney as Rudy
William Pullen as Tom
George Ross as Cliff
George Pembroke as Jed
Vicente Padula as Julio
Tom Hubbard as Harv

References

External links 
 

1957 films
American Western (genre) films
1957 Western (genre) films
Republic Pictures films
Films directed by Paul Landres
1950s English-language films
1950s American films